Canada in Khaki was a magazine published in Toronto by the Musson Book Company and by the Canadian War Records Office to illustrate Canadians' actions during World War I and raise money for the Canadian War Memorial Fund. Canada in Khaki was published in 1917–1919 in three volumes. The magazine had a subheading A Tribute to the Officers and Men now serving in the Overseas Military Forces of Canada. A collection of war art reproductions, cartoons, military history and personal recollections, it featured illustrations by contemporary artists, such as John Byam Liston Shaw, Harold H. Piffard and others.

References

External links
 Canada In Khaki, First Edition, 1917
 Canada In Khaki, Second Edition, 1918

Magazines published in Toronto
Military history of Canada during World War I
World War I publications
Magazines established in 1917
Magazines disestablished in 1919
Military magazines published in Canada
Defunct magazines published in Canada
1917 establishments in Ontario
1919 disestablishments in Ontario